Chaypareh-ye Pain Rural District is in Zanjanrud District of Zanjan County, Zanjan province, Iran. At the National Census of 2006, its population was 4,732 in 1,043 households. There were 4,178 inhabitants in 1,065 households at the following census of 2011. At the most recent census of 2016, the population of the rural district was 3,797 in 1,086 households. The largest of its 13 villages was Moshampa, with 1,203 people.

References 

Zanjan County

Rural Districts of Zanjan Province

Populated places in Zanjan Province

Populated places in Zanjan County